Following are the results of the 2009–10 Reggina Calcio season in Italian football.

Reggina Calcio were among the favourites for an immediate return to Serie A, but failed to make a mark in an extremely competitive Serie B, and despite finishing in the midfield, it was long involved in the fight for survival in the second flight. On a positive note, defensive midfielder Carlos Carmona got his breakthrough, and following an inspired showing at the 2010 FIFA World Cup, the Chilean was sold to Atalanta for a good income.

Squad

Goalkeepers
  Vincenzo Fiorillo
  Pietro Marino
  Adam Kovacsik

Defenders
  Daniel Adejo
  Andrea Costa
  Vincenzo Camilleri
  Carlos Valdez
  Simone Rizzato
  Santos
  Maurizio Lanzaro

Midfielders
  José Montiel
  Ivan Castiglia
  Biagio Pagano
  Luca Vigiani
  Carlos Carmona
  Antonino Barillà
  Giacomo Tedesco
  Nicolas Viola
  Emmanuel Cascione
  Simone Missiroli
  Franco Brienza

Attackers
  Emiliano Bonazzoli
  Daniele Cacia
  Franco Brienza

Serie B

References 
 

Reggina 1914 seasons
Reggina